The following list of international English food terms points out differences in food terminology between some different dialects of English:soft drinks in Scotland are actually called ginger ie can of ginger or a bottle of ginger.

List

Digestive biscuits and Graham crackers 

These two items are fairly different, but are used similarly (e.g. to make crumb crusts for a cheesecake).  Graham crackers are sweeter, and are available in different flavors (e.g. cinnamon, chocolate).  Digestive biscuits are richer, and while slightly sweet, are used with cheese by a small minority.  They are also available coated on one side with milk chocolate or dark chocolate. Digestive biscuits are common in the Northeast United States, served with tea. Peek Frean is a common brand in the United States, however the original producer McVities still produces the biscuit in the UK.

Chips and French fries 
In Ireland and the UK, deep fried potato sticks or "french fries" are called "skinny chips/fries", while "chips" are thicker potato sticks which can be deep fried or oven baked.

Apple juice, cider and hard cider 
In America, fermented apple juice is called "hard cider". "Apple cider" refers to unfiltered  (un-fermented) apple juice, typically pasteurized to make it shelf-stable. In New England and parts of Canada, "fresh cider" or sweet cider refers to fresh pressed apple juice; this is unlike any commercial product, and can be found at farm stands and orchards.

American cider (both fresh and hard) is sometimes also made from pears. This is referred to as "pear cider," and is equivalent to perry.

See also 

 American and British English differences
 British Approved Name

Food and drink terminology